

As a surname 
Notable people with this surname include:

Chris Deaner, American musician, filmmaker, and programmer
Cody Deaner (born 1981), ring-name of Chris Gray, Canadian wrestler
Jacqueline Deaner (born 1979), American beauty-pageant winner

Other 

Deaner is also the nickname of American guitarist and co-founder of Ween, Mickey Melchiando, also known as Dean Ween.

See also 
Dean (given name)
Dean (surname)
Deanery

References